Henry Sacheverell Carleton Richardson (born 1883) was a unionist politician in Northern Ireland.

Richardson studied at Eton College before joining the British Army in 1902.  In 1914, he was appointed aide-de-camp to the Governor of Tasmania.  During World War I, he commanded the 8th Battalion of the Somerset Light Infantry, then the 2nd and 13th Battalions of the Rifle Brigade.  He left the Army in 1920, later becoming aide-de-camp to the Duke of Abercorn.

In 1949, Richardson was appointed as an Ulster Unionist Party member of the Senate of Northern Ireland, serving until 1957. He also stood for the party in Fermanagh and South Tyrone at the 1950 general election; he took second place with 48.1% of the votes.

References

1883 births
Year of death missing
Members of the Senate of Northern Ireland 1949–1953
Members of the Senate of Northern Ireland 1953–1957
People educated at Eton College
Rifle Brigade officers
Somerset Light Infantry officers
Ulster Unionist Party members of the Senate of Northern Ireland